A grove of lemon trees is a citrus grove specifically of the lemon. Other things named that include:

 Lemon Grove, California
 Lemon Grove School District
 Lemon Grove Middle School
 Lemon Grove Depot
 Lemon Grove Incident
 Lemon Grove, Florida
 Lemon Grove Kids Meet the Monsters
 Road to the Lemon Grove